Dimethylcarbamoyl fluoride is a chemical compound that can be produced by fluorination of dimethylcarbamoyl chloride with potassium fluoride. It's a colorless liquid that is soluble and stable in water.

Dimethylcarbamoyl fluoride is highly toxic because it's a potent cholinesterase inhibitor and is lethal even at low doses.

See also
Dimethylcarbamoyl chloride

References

Acyl fluorides
Acetylcholinesterase inhibitors